Dexing is a county-level city in the northeast of Jiangxi province, China, bordering Zhejiang province to the east. It is under the jurisdiction of the prefecture-level city of Shangrao.

Administrative divisions
In the present, Dexing City has 3 subdistricts, 5 towns and 6 townships.
3 subdistricts
 Yincheng
 Xinying
 Xiangtun

5 towns

6 townships

Demographics 
Dexing is the original home of corporate finance expert Nan Jiang.

Climate

Transportation 
Dexing railway station is situated near Longtoushan and is an intermediate stop on the Hefei–Fuzhou high-speed railway. Dexing East railway station is situated near Xingangshan and is an intermediate stop on the Jiujiang–Quzhou railway.

Notes and references 

Cities in Jiangxi
Xinzhou
Shangrao